Chetwynd is a small inland town near Ganoo Ganoo Bushland Reserve.

Reference List

Towns in Victoria (Australia)